The 2018–19 Houston Rockets season was the 52nd season of the franchise in the National Basketball Association (NBA), and their 48th in the Houston area.

Despite early struggles in the season including an on-court altercation between rival guards Chris Paul and Rajon Rondo, injuries among its players, and losing core players including Trevor Ariza, the team made a dramatic improvement and finished as the 4th seed in the West. Most notable within the surge would be Harden's impressive play. It included his 30-point streak which started on December 11, all the way to a surprising 32 games until ending on February 25. This streak had left him 2nd for continuous 30+ points in a game, leaving Wilt Chamberlain as 1st. On March 24, against the Pelicans, they had clinched another playoff spot for the 7th straight year.

In the playoffs, the Rockets defeated the Utah Jazz in the First Round in five games. However, the Rockets would lose in six games against the two-time defending NBA champion Golden State Warriors in the Western Conference Semi-finals, their fourth playoff exit against the Warriors in the last five postseasons. They previously lost to the Warriors in 2015 (conference finals), 2016 (first round), and 2018 (conference finals).

Draft picks

Entering the night of the draft, the Rockets had only one selection at hand, with it being the pick they acquired from the Miami Heat via a previous trade involving the Memphis Grizzlies and Charlotte Hornets, being the lowest second round pick of those teams. On the night of the draft, the Rockets selected former University of Southern California guard De'Anthony Melton as their sole selection that year. Melton only played one season at USC, playing that previous season as a starter in 25 out of 36 games played there, recording averages of 8.3 points, 4.7 rebounds, 3.5 assists, 1.0 blocks, and 1.9 steals per game that season. He was originally planned to play in his sophomore season, but was suspended and later left in relation to the 2017–18 NCAA Division I men's basketball corruption scandal. Prior to the start of the season, Melton was traded alongside veteran power forward Ryan Anderson to the Phoenix Suns on August 31, 2018, in exchange for veteran point guard Brandon Knight and power forward Marquese Chriss.

Roster

<noinclude>

Standings

Division

Conference

Game log

Preseason

|- style="background:#cfc;"
| 1
| October 2
| @ Memphis
| 
| Chris Paul (22)
| Green, Capela (6)
| Chris Paul (9)
| Legacy Arena16,888
| 1–0
|- style="background:#fcc;"
| 2
| October 4
| Indiana
| 
| James Harden (17)
| James Ennis III (6)
| James Harden (10)
| Toyota Center17,089
| 1–1
|- style="background:#cfc;"
| 3
| October 7
| @ San Antonio
| 
| James Harden (21)
| Chris Paul (8)
| Paul, Harden (9)
| AT&T Center18,326
| 2–1
|- style="background:#cfc;"
| 4
| October 9
| Shanghai Sharks
| 
| James Harden (37)
| Bruno Caboclo (7)
| Paul, Harden (9)
| Toyota Center16,317
| 3–1
|- style="background:#cfc;"
| 5
| October 12
| @ Memphis
| 
| James Harden (23)
| Clint Capela (13)
| Chris Paul (11)
| FedEx Forum12,576
| 4–1

Regular season

|- style="background:#fcc;"
| 1
| October 17
| New Orleans
| 
| Eric Gordon (21)
| James Harden (9)
| James Harden (10)
| Toyota Center18,055
| 0–1
|- style="background:#cfc;"
| 2
| October 20
| @ LA Lakers
| 
| James Harden (36)
| Clint Capela (12)
| Chris Paul (10)
| Staples Center18,997
| 1–1
|- style="background:#fcc;"
| 3
| October 21
| @ LA Clippers
| 
| James Harden (31)
| Capela, Anthony (6)
| James Harden (14)
| Staples Center16,149
| 1–2
|- style="background:#fcc;"
| 4
| October 24
| Utah
| 
| James Harden (29)
| Clint Capela (12)
| James Harden (7)
| Toyota Center18,055
| 1–3
|- style="background:#fcc;"
| 5
| October 26
| LA Clippers
| 
| Carmelo Anthony (24)
| Clint Capela (15)
| Chris Paul (8)
| Toyota Center18,055
| 1–4
|- style="background:#fcc;"
| 6
| October 30
| Portland
| 
| Chris Paul (17)
| Clint Capela (14)
| Chris Paul (9)
| Toyota Center18,055
| 1–5

|- style="background:#cfc;"
| 7
| November 2
| @ Brooklyn
| 
| Chris Paul (32)
| Clint Capela (13)
| Chris Paul (11)
| Barclays Center14,013
| 2–5
|- style="background:#cfc;"
| 8
| November 3
| @ Chicago
| 
| James Harden (25)
| Clint Capela (12)
| Chris Paul (8)
| United Center20,505
| 3–5
|- style="background:#cfc;"
| 9
| November 5
| @ Indiana
| 
| James Harden (28)
| Clint Capela (10)
| Chris Paul (13)
| Bankers Life Fieldhouse14,735
| 4–5
|- style="background:#fcc;"
| 10
| November 8
| @ Oklahoma City
| 
| James Harden (19)
| James Harden (8)
| James Harden (5)
| Chesapeake Energy Arena  18,203
| 4–6
|- style="background:#fcc;"
| 11
| November 10
| @ San Antonio
| 
| James Harden (25)
| Clint Capela (17)
| Chris Paul (4)
| AT&T Center18,354
| 4–7
|- style="background:#cfc;"
| 12
| November 11
| Indiana
| 
| James Harden (40)
| Gary Clark (8)
| James Harden (9)
| Toyota Center18,055
| 5–7
|- style="background:#cfc;"
| 13
| November 13
| @ Denver
| 
| Clint Capela (24)
| Clint Capela (9)
| James Harden (11)
| Pepsi Center16,741
| 6–7
|- style="background:#cfc;"
| 14
| November 15
| Golden State
| 
| James Harden (27)
| Clint Capela (10)
| Chris Paul (7)
| Toyota Center18,055
| 7–7
|- style="background:#cfc;"
| 15
| November 17
| Sacramento
| 
| James Harden (34)
| Clint Capela (16)
| Chris Paul (9)
| Toyota Center18,055
| 8–7
|- style="background:#cfc;"
| 16
| November 21
| Detroit
| 
| James Harden (43)
| Clint Capela (15)
| James Harden (9)
| Toyota Center18,055
| 9–7
|- style="background:#fcc;"
| 17
| November 23
| @ Detroit
| 
| James Harden (33)
| Clint Capela (21)
| Chris Paul (9)
| Little Caesars Arena17,268
| 9–8
|- style="background:#fcc;"
| 18
| November 24
| @ Cleveland
| 
| James Harden (40)
| Clint Capela (10)
| James Harden (13)
| Quicken Loans Arena19,432
| 9–9
|- style="background:#fcc;"
| 19
| November 26
| @ Washington
| 
| James Harden (54)
| Clint Capela (14)
| James Harden (13)
| Capital One Arena16,872
| 9–10
|- style="background:#fcc;"
| 20
| November 28
| Dallas
| 
| James Harden (25)
| James Harden (11)
| James Harden (17)
| Toyota Center18,055
| 9–11
|- style="background:#cfc;"
| 21
| November 30
| @ San Antonio
| 
| Clint Capela (27)
| Clint Capela (12)
| Harden, Paul (10)
| AT&T Center18,354
| 10–11

|- style="background:#cfc;"
| 22
| December 1
| Chicago
| 
| James Harden (30)
| Clint Capela (15)
| Chris Paul (13)
| Toyota Center18,055
| 11–11
|- style="background:#fcc;"
| 23
| December 3
| @ Minnesota
| 
| James Harden (29)
| P. J. Tucker (9)
| James Harden (8)
| Target Center13,834
| 11–12
|- style="background:#fcc;"
| 24
| December 6
| @ Utah
| 
| James Harden (15)
| Clint Capela (10)
| Chris Paul (5)
| Vivint Smart Home Arena18,306
| 11–13
|- style="background:#fcc;"
| 25
| December 8
| @ Dallas
| 
| James Harden (35)
| Clint Capela (13)
| Harden, Paul (8)
| American Airlines Center20,254
| 11–14
|- style="background:#cfc;"
| 26
| December 11
| Portland
| 
| James Harden (30)
| Chris Paul (11)
| Chris Paul (10)
| Toyota Center18,055
| 12–14
|- style="background:#cfc;"
| 27
| December 13
| LA Lakers
| 
| James Harden (50)
| Clint Capela (13)
| James Harden (11)
| Toyota Center18,055
| 13–14
|- style="background:#cfc;"
| 28
| December 15
| @ Memphis
| 
| James Harden (32)
| James Harden (12)
| Harden, Paul (10)
| FedExForum16,777
| 14–14
|- style="background:#cfc;"
| 29
| December 17
| Utah
| 
| James Harden (47)
| Clint Capela (14)
| Chris Paul (9)
| Toyota Center18,055
| 15–14
|- style="background:#cfc;"
| 30
| December 19
| Washington
| 
| James Harden (36)
| Clint Capela (12)
| James Harden (9)
| Toyota Center18,055
| 16–14
|- style="background:#fcc;"
| 31
| December 20
| @ Miami
| 
| James Harden (35)
| Clint Capela (14)
| James Harden (12)
| American Airlines Arena19,600
| 16–15
|- style="background:#cfc;"
| 32
| December 22
| San Antonio
| 
| James Harden (38)
| Clint Capela (22)
| James Harden (10)
| Toyota Center 18,055
| 17–15
|- style="background:#cfc;"
| 33
| December 25
| Oklahoma City
| 
| James Harden (41)
| Clint Capela (23)
| James Harden (7)
| Toyota Center 18,055
| 18–15
|- style="background:#cfc;"
| 34
| December 27
| Boston
| 
| James Harden (45)
| Clint Capela (18)
| James Harden (6)
| Toyota Center 18,055
| 19–15
|- style="background:#cfc;"
| 35
| December 29
| @ New Orleans
| 
| James Harden (41)
| James Harden (9)
| Austin Rivers (7)
| Smoothie King Center17,555
| 20–15
|- style="background:#cfc;"
| 36
| December 31
| Memphis
| 
| James Harden (43)
| Clint Capela (13)
| James Harden (13)
| Toyota Center18,055
| 21–15

|- style="background:#cfc;"
| 37
| January 3
| @ Golden State
| 
| James Harden (44)
| Clint Capela (21)
| James Harden (15)
| Oracle Arena19,596
| 22–15
|- style="background:#fcc;"
| 38
| January 5
| @ Portland
| 
| James Harden (38)
| Clint Capela (21)
| James Harden (8)
| Moda Center19,577
| 22–16
|- style="background:#cfc;"
| 39
| January 7
| Denver
| 
| James Harden (32)
| Clint Capela (9)
| James Harden (14)
| Toyota Center18,055
| 23–16
|- style="background:#fcc;"
| 40
| January 9
| Milwaukee
| 
| James Harden (42)
| Clint Capela (13)
| P. J. Tucker (7)
| Toyota Center18,055
| 23–17
|- style="background:#cfc;"
| 41
| January 11
| Cleveland
| 
| James Harden (43)
| James Harden (10)
| James Harden (11)
| Toyota Center18,055
| 24–17
|- style="background:#fcc;"
| 42
| January 13
| @ Orlando
| 
| James Harden (38)
| Clint Capela (10)
| James Harden (12)
| Amway Center16,982
| 24–18
|- style="background:#cfc;"
| 43
| January 14
| Memphis
| 
| James Harden (57)
| James Harden (9)
| Austin Rivers (6)
| Toyota Center18,055
| 25–18
|- style="background:#fcc;"
| 44
| January 16
| Brooklyn
| 
| James Harden (58)
| Harden, Tucker (10)
| Harden, Rivers (6)
| Toyota Center18,055
| 25–19
|- style="background:#cfc;"
| 45
| January 19
| LA Lakers
| 
| James Harden (48)
| P. J. Tucker (9)
| James Harden (6)
| Toyota Center18,055
| 26–19
|- style="background:#fcc;"
| 46
| January 21
| @ Philadelphia
| 
| James Harden (37)
| Harden, Tucker, Faried (6)
| Harden, Rivers (3)
| Wells Fargo Center20,313
| 26–20
|- style="background:#cfc;"
| 47
| January 23
| @ New York
| 
| James Harden (61)
| James Harden (15)
| Harden, Rivers (4)
| Madison Square Garden18,819
| 27–20
|- style="background:#cfc;"
| 48
| January 25
| Toronto
| 
| James Harden (35)
| Kenneth Faried (14)
| James Harden (7)
| Toyota Center18,055
| 28–20
|- style="background:#cfc;"
| 49
| January 27
| Orlando
| 
| James Harden (40)
| James Harden (11)
| Harden, Paul (6)
| Toyota Center18,055
| 29–20
|- style="background:#fcc;"
| 50
| January 29
| New Orleans
| 
| James Harden (37)
| Harden, Faried (11)
| Chris Paul (9)
| Toyota Center18,055
| 29–21

|- style="background:#fcc;"
| 51
| February 1
| @ Denver
| 
| James Harden (30)
| Harden, Faried (6)
| James Harden (9)
| Pepsi Center20,106
| 29–22
|- style="background:#cfc;"
| 52
| February 2
| @ Utah
| 
| James Harden (43)
| Harden, Faried (12)
| James Harden (5)
| Vivint Smart Home Arena18,306
| 30–22
|- style="background:#cfc;"
| 53
| February 4
| @ Phoenix
| 
| James Harden (44)
| Kenneth Faried (14)
| James Harden (6)
| Talking Stick Resort Arena15,740
| 31–22
|- style="background:#cfc;"
| 54
| February 6
| @ Sacramento
| 
| James Harden (36)
| Kenneth Faried (11)
| Chris Paul (11)
| Golden 1 Center17,583
| 32–22
|- style="background:#fcc;"
| 55
| February 9
| Oklahoma City
| 
| James Harden (42)
| Kenneth Faried (12)
| Chris Paul (9)
| Toyota Center18,061
| 32–23
|- style="background:#cfc;"
| 56
| February 11
| Dallas
| 
| James Harden (31)
| Harden, Faried (8)
| Chris Paul (11)
| Toyota Center18,055
| 33–23
|- style="background:#fcc;"
| 57
| February 13
| @ Minnesota
| 
| James Harden (42)
| Kenneth Faried (11)
| Chris Paul (8)
| Target Center15,131
| 33–24
|- align="center"
|colspan="9" bgcolor="#bbcaff"|All-Star Break
|- style="background:#cfc;"
|- style="background:#fcc;"
| 58
| February 21
| @ LA Lakers
| 
| James Harden (30)
| Clint Capela (11)
| Chris Paul (9)
| Staples Center18,997
| 33–25
|- style="background:#cfc;"
| 59
| February 23
| @ Golden State
| 
| Eric Gordon (25)
| Clint Capela (15)
| Chris Paul (17)
| Oracle Arena19,596
| 34–25
|- style="background:#cfc;"
| 60
| February 25
| Atlanta
| 
| James Harden (28)
| Kenneth Faried (10)
| Chris Paul (8)
| Toyota Center18,055
| 35–25
|- style="background:#cfc;"
| 61
| February 27
| @ Charlotte
| 
| James Harden (30)
| Clint Capela (17)
| Chris Paul (8)
| Spectrum Center17,903
| 36–25
|- style="background:#cfc;"
| 62
| February 28
| Miami
| 
| James Harden (58)
| Clint Capela (11)
| James Harden (10)
| Toyota Center18,055
| 37–25

|- style="background:#cfc;"
| 63
| March 3
| @ Boston
| 
| James Harden (42)
| Clint Capela (9)
| Chris Paul (12)
| TD Garden18,624
| 38–25
|- style="background:#cfc;"
| 64
| March 5
| @ Toronto
| 
| James Harden (35)
| Clint Capela (15)
| Chris Paul (10)
| Scotiabank Arena19,800
| 39–25
|- style="background:#cfc;"
| 65
| March 8
| Philadelphia
| 
| James Harden (31)
| James Harden (10)
| Chris Paul (8)
| Toyota Center18,055
| 40–25
|- style="background:#cfc;"
| 66
| March 10
| @ Dallas
| 
| James Harden (26)
| Clint Capela (12)
| Chris Paul (9)
| American Airlines Center20,423
| 41–25
|- style="background:#cfc;"
| 67
| March 11
| Charlotte
| 
| James Harden (28)
| Clint Capela (15)
| James Harden (10)
| Toyota Center18,055
| 42–25
|- style="background:#fcc;"
| 68
| March 13
| Golden State
| 
| James Harden (29)
| Clint Capela (13)
| James Harden (10)
| Toyota Center18,122
| 42–26
|- style="background:#cfc;"
| 69
| March 15
| Phoenix
| 
| James Harden (41)
| Clint Capela (11)
| James Harden (11)
| Toyota Center18,055
| 43–26
|- style="background:#cfc;"
| 70
| March 17
| Minnesota
|                                                                                                                                                                                                                                                                                  
| Chris Paul (25)
| Clint Capela (13)
| Harden, Paul (10)
| Toyota Center18,055
| 44–26
|- style="background:#cfc;"
| 71
| March 19
| @ Atlanta
| 
| James Harden (31)
| Clint Capela (11)
| Chris Paul (11)
| State Farm Arena16,293
| 45–26
|- style="background:#fcc;"
| 72
| March 20
| @ Memphis
| 
| James Harden (57)
| Clint Capela (10)
| James Harden (8)
| FedExForum16,691
| 45–27
|- style="background:#cfc;"
| 73
| March 22
| San Antonio
| 
| James Harden (61)
| Clint Capela (16)
| Chris Paul (5)
| Toyota Center18,055
| 46–27
|- style="background:#cfc;"
| 74
| March 24
| @ New Orleans
| 
| James Harden (28)
| Clint Capela (17)
| Chris Paul (13)
| Smoothie King Center17,048
| 47–27
|- style="background:#fcc;"
| 75
| March 26
| @ Milwaukee
| 
| James Harden (23)
| Clint Capela (11)
| James Harden (7)
| Fiserv Forum17,910
| 47–28
|- style="background:#cfc;"
| 76
| March 28
| Denver
| 
| James Harden (38)
| Clint Capela (15)
| Chris Paul (8)
| Toyota Center18,055
| 48–28
|- style="background:#cfc;"
| 77
| March 30
| Sacramento
| 
| James Harden (50)
| Clint Capela (15)
| James Harden (10)
| Toyota Center18,055
| 49–28

|- style="background:#cfc;"
| 78
| April 2
| @ Sacramento
| 
| James Harden (36)
| Clint Capela (13)
| Chris Paul (12)
| Golden 1 Center17,583
| 50–28
|- style="background:#cfc;"
| 79
| April 3
| @ LA Clippers
| 
| James Harden (31)
| Clint Capela (15)
| Harden, Paul (7)
| Staples Center17,593
| 51–28
|- style="background:#cfc;"
| 80
| April 5
| New York
| 
| James Harden (26)
| Clint Capela (15)
| Chris Paul (10)
| Toyota Center18,055
| 52–28
|- style="background:#cfc;"
| 81
| April 7
| Phoenix
| 
| James Harden (30)
| Capela, Harden  (13)
| Paul, Harden  (9)
| Toyota Center18,055
| 53–28
|- style="background:#fcc;"
| 82
| April 9
| @ Oklahoma City
| 
| James Harden (39)
| Capela, Harden (10)
| Chris Paul (6)
| Chesapeake Energy Arena18,203
| 53–29

Playoffs

|- bgcolor=ccffcc
| 1
| April 14
| Utah
| 
| James Harden (29)
| Clint Capela (12)
| James Harden (10)
| Toyota Center18,055
| 1–0
|- bgcolor=ccffcc
| 2
| April 17
| Utah
| 
| James Harden (32)
| James Harden (13)
| James Harden (10)
| Toyota Center18,055
| 2–0
|- bgcolor=ccffcc
| 3
| April 20
| @ Utah
| 
| James Harden (22)
| Clint Capela (14)
| James Harden (10)
| Vivint Smart Home Arena18,306
| 3–0
|- bgcolor=ffcccc
| 4
| April 22
| @ Utah
| 
| James Harden (30)
| Chris Paul (8)
| Chris Paul (7)
| Vivint Smart Home Arena18,306
| 3–1
|- bgcolor=ccffcc
| 5
| April 24
| Utah
| 
| James Harden (26)
| Clint Capela (10)
| James Harden (6)
| Toyota Center18,055
| 4–1

|- style="background:#fcc;"
| 1
| April 28
| @ Golden State
| 
| James Harden (35)
| Clint Capela (6)
| James Harden (6)
| Oracle Arena19,596
| 0–1
|- style="background:#fcc;"
| 2
| April 30
| @ Golden State
| 
| James Harden (29)
| Tucker, Capela (10)
| Chris Paul (6)
| Oracle Arena19,596
| 0–2
|- style="background:#cfc;"
| 3
| May 4
| Golden State
| 
| James Harden (41)
| P. J. Tucker (12)
| Chris Paul (7)
| Toyota Center18,169
| 1–2
|- style="background:#cfc;"
| 4
| May 6
| Golden State
| 
| James Harden (38)
| Harden, Tucker (10)
| Chris Paul (5)
| Toyota Center18,169
| 2–2
|- style="background:#fcc;"
| 5
| May 8
| @ Golden State
| 
| James Harden (31)
| Clint Capela (14)
| James Harden (8)
| Oracle Arena19,596
| 2–3
|- style="background:#fcc;"
| 6
| May 10
| Golden State
| 
| James Harden (35)
| Chris Paul (11)
| Chris Paul (5)
| Toyota Center18,055
| 2–4

Player statistics

Regular season

|-
| align="left"|† || align="center"| PF
| 10 || 2 || 294 || 54 || 5 || 4 || 7 || 134
|-
| align="left"| || align="center"| C
| 67 || 67 || 2,249 || style=";"|848 || 96 || 44 || style=";"|102 || 1,114
|-
| align="left"|† || align="center"| PG
| 16 || 1 || 145 || 13 || 21 || 9 || 6 || 69
|-
| align="left"|≠ || align="center"| PG
| 7 || 0 || 33 || 4 || 4 || 1 || 1 || 6
|-
| align="left"|† || align="center"| PF
| 16 || 0 || 104 || 28 || 6 || 2 || 4 || 29
|-
| align="left"| || align="center"| PF
| 51 || 2 || 641 || 116 || 18 || 20 || 26 || 148
|-
| align="left"| || align="center"| SF
| 2 || 0 || 16 || 2 || 0 || 0 || 0 || 3
|-
| align="left"|† || align="center"| SF
| 40 || 25 || 949 || 117 || 27 || 38 || 16 || 294
|-
| align="left"|≠ || align="center"| C
| 25 || 13 || 610 || 206 || 18 || 15 || 19 || 323
|-
| align="left"| || align="center"| SG
| 68 || 53 || 2,158 || 148 || 129 || 41 || 27 || 1,103
|-
| align="left"| || align="center"| SG
| 73 || 0 || 1,473 || 182 || 40 || 33 || 27 || 675
|-
| align="left"| || align="center"| PG
| 78 || 78 || style=";"|2,867 || 518 || style=";"|586 || style=";"|158 || 58 || style=";"|2,818
|-
| align="left"| || align="center"| PF
| 28 || 0 || 221 || 47 || 15 || 7 || 12 || 53
|-
| align="left"|‡ || align="center"| SF
| 39 || 13 || 979 || 140 || 40 || 21 || 11 || 366
|-
| align="left"|≠ || align="center"| PF
| 2 || 0 || 5 || 4 || 0 || 0 || 0 || 2
|-
| align="left"|† || align="center"| PG
| 12 || 0 || 118 || 9 || 9 || 2 || 0 || 36
|-
| align="left"|Nenê || align="center"| C
| 42 || 2 || 546 || 123 || 26 || 18 || 15 || 151
|-
| align="left"|≠ || align="center"| SF
| 2 || 0 || 38 || 1 || 2 || 0 || 0 || 9
|-
| align="left"| || align="center"| PG
| 58 || 58 || 1,857 || 265 || 473 || 114 || 18 || 906
|-
| align="left"|≠ || align="center"| SG
| 47 || 13 || 1,345 || 91 || 109 || 29 || 13 || 408
|-
| align="left"|≠ || align="center"| SG
| 20 || 1 || 382 || 54 || 21 || 12 || 4 || 91
|-
| align="left"| || align="center"| PF
| style=";"|82 || style=";"|82 || 2,802 || 479 || 96 || 132 || 39 || 601
|-
| align="left"|Zhou Qi‡ || align="center"| PF
| 1 || 0 || 1 || 0 || 0 || 0 || 0 || 2
|}
After all games.
‡Waived during the season
†Traded during the season
≠Acquired during the season

Playoffs

|-
| align="left"| || align="center"| C
| style=";"|11 || style=";"|11 || 331 || style=";"|113 || 16 || 3 || style=";"|12 || 107
|-
| align="left"| || align="center"| PF
| 2 || 0 || 4 || 1 || 0 || 0 || 0 || 0
|-
| align="left"| || align="center"| C
| 6 || 0 || 56 || 21 || 2 || 2 || 0 || 24
|-
| align="left"| || align="center"| SG
| style=";"|11 || style=";"|11 || 410 || 27 || 14 || 7 || 11 || 196
|-
| align="left"| || align="center"| SG
| style=";"|11 || 0 || 97 || 12 || 1 || 3 || 3 || 39
|-
| align="left"| || align="center"| PG
| style=";"|11 || style=";"|11 || 424 || 76 || style=";"|73 || style=";"|24 || 10 || style=";"|348
|-
| align="left"| || align="center"| PF
| 2 || 0 || 2 || 1 || 0 || 0 || 0 || 4
|-
| align="left"| || align="center"| SF
| 7 || 0 || 53 || 14 || 3 || 3 || 2 || 27
|-
| align="left"|Nenê || align="center"| C
| 7 || 0 || 141 || 22 || 1 || 3 || 2 || 34
|-
| align="left"| || align="center"| PG
| style=";"|11 || style=";"|11 || 397 || 70 || 60 || style=";"|24 || 7 || 187
|-
| align="left"| || align="center"| SG
| 10 || 0 || 215 || 21 || 10 || 5 || 1 || 74
|-
| align="left"| || align="center"| SG
| 8 || 0 || 109 || 12 || 2 || 1 || 0 || 29
|-
| align="left"| || align="center"| PF
| style=";"|11 || style=";"|11 || style=";"|426 || 82 || 19 || 19 || 8 || 125
|}

Transactions

Trades

Free agency

Re-signed

Additions

Subtractions

Awards

References

Houston Rockets seasons
Houston Rockets
Houston Rockets
Houston Rockets